The U.S. Professional Match Play Championship was a PGA Tour event that was played in North Carolina in the early 1970s. 

The event was first played as the Liggett & Myers Open Match Play Championship in 1971 at The Country Club of North Carolina in Pinehurst. The field of 64 players in 1971 consisted of the winners of tour events from the previous 12 months and the leaders from the 1971 money list. The tournament was played in medal match play. The purse in 1971 was $267,500 with $35,000 going to the winner.

For 1972, the tournament, now called the U.S. Professional Match Play Championship, was held in conjunction with the Liggett & Myers Open. Eight players were exempt into the field of 16 with the other eight players being the leaders after the first two rounds of the Liggett & Myers Open. The tournament was played on Saturday and Sunday, two rounds each day, concurrently with the final two rounds of the Liggett & Myers Open. The tournament was played at normal match play. The purse in 1972 was $150,000 with $40,000 going to the winner. Losers in the first round received $5,000, or more than the fourth place finisher in the Liggett & Myers Open.

In 1973, the format and purse remained the same but the events shifted to MacGregor Downs Country Club in Cary, North Carolina.

Winners

References

Former PGA Tour events
Golf in North Carolina
1971 establishments in North Carolina
1973 disestablishments in North Carolina
Recurring sporting events established in 1971
Recurring sporting events disestablished in 1973